Scaevola virgata is a species of flowering plant in the family Goodeniaceae. It is a perennial, much-branched, small shrub has white to blue flowers and endemic to Western Australia.

Description

Taxonomy and naming
Scaevola virgata was first formally described in 1990 by Roger Carolin and the description was published in Telopea. The specific epithet (virgata) means "long and slender".

Distribution and habitat
This scaevola grows in heath or scrubland in rocky soils on the Ogilvie Plains and Watheroo.

References

virgata
Flora of Western Australia